Gnomon Island is a small rocky island lying just north of Point Wild, on Elephant Island in the South Shetland Islands. It was charted by Ernest Shackleton's Endurance expedition, 1914–1916, and so named by them because when viewed from Point Wild the shape of the feature is suggestive of a gnomon, the elevated arm of a sundial.

See also 
 List of antarctic and sub-antarctic islands

References

Islands of the South Shetland Islands